Antonio Américo Alberino  (26 October 1910 – 13 August 1991) was an Argentine football striker who won two league championships with Boca Juniors.

Alberino started his career in 1929 at the age of 18, he went on to play 107 matches in all competitions for the club and scored 28 goals. During his time with Boca Juniors the club won two league titles in 1930 and 1931. In 1934 he left Boca to join Club Atlético Tigre, he finished his career playing in the Argentine 2nd division with All Boys.

Titles

References

External links

1910 births
1991 deaths
Argentine footballers
Association football forwards
Argentine Primera División players
Boca Juniors footballers
Club Atlético Tigre footballers
All Boys footballers
Footballers from Buenos Aires